George Darouze (born November 1964) is the Ottawa City Councillor for Osgoode Ward. He was elected for the first time in the 2014 Ottawa municipal election.

Darouze immigrated from Lebanon in 1990, settling in the community of Greely, Ontario in Osgoode Township, which would be amalgamated into Ottawa in 2001.

Darouze graduated from Lebanese Academy of Fine Arts with a degree in Telecommunications. After moving to Canada, he worked in a number of odd-jobs such as busboy, baker, dishwasher and fast food employee before purchasing a pizzeria. Later, he became a sales representative for a Bell Mobility dealer, which led him to work in a number of managerial positions for various telecommunications companies. He speaks English, French and Arabic. He is the former president of the Ottawa-Carleton Snowmobile Trail Club.

Darouze has supported Conservative Member of Parliament Pierre Poilievre, as well as the previous councillor for Osgoode Ward, Doug Thompson. 

Darouze, along with Laura Dudas and Matthew Luloff was appointed as a deputy mayor of the city in December 2018.

In 2020, Darouze was caught texting while driving while livestreaming as part of a virtual meeting of the city's audit committee. Darouze indicated he had done so "inadvertently." He has since apologized. 

In 2022, Darouze won re-election as the representative for Osgoode Ward 20. He won the election by a margin of approximately 200 votes, securing a third term on Ottawa's city council.

Committees
As of February 2023, Darouze sits on the following Committees and Boards of Directors:

 Transportation Committee
 Agriculture and Rural Affairs Committee
 Finance and Economic Development Committee 
 Planning and Housing Committee (ex-officio) 
 South Nation Conservation Authority

Volunteering and awards 
Darouze has volunteered with the Greely Winter Carnival, the Osgoode Village and Metcalfe Santa Claus Parades, the Vernon Arts and Crafts Show, and the Ottawa Regional Cancer Foundation.

In 2011, Darouze was awarded Volunteer of the Year by the Ontario Federation of Snowmobile Clubs. George's extensive volunteer work was also recognized in 2011 when he received the Osgoode Ward Community Volunteer Award, and in 2012 when he became a Queen's Diamond Jubilee medal recipient.

Integrity commissioner investigation and lawsuit 
According to CBC News, Darouze "tried to silence a woman who criticized him on social media during last fall's [2018] municipal election by writing to her husband's boss, the chief of police, according to a scathing report from the city's integrity commissioner."

The complaint was received on March 12, 2019.

The commissioner stated that "on a balance of probabilities, I find that the major motivation of the councillor was to bully and intimidate the complainants and each of them in the hope that female complainant might cease her critical Facebook commentary of him." The commissioner further wrote that it was written "for the primary reason of silencing the female complainant and causing the male complainant grief in his workplace."

Darouze was criticized online over the matter.

The matter is ongoing (as of September 22, 2021); the complainant and her husband have filed a lawsuit against Darouze for alleged damages, as reported on June 19, 2020. Following the commissioner's report, Darouze had emailed the couple that he was "truly sorry" that they "perceived" his actions as harassment.

On February 24, 2021 (Anti-Bullying Day), Darouze posted on his Facebook page "let's all be mindful to to stand up against bullying today and everyday, all year!"

Political positions

From the news 
On August 31, 2016, Darouze argued against banning hookah waterpipe smoking indoors, saying: "I'm tired of being the nanny state and the government telling us how to do our business. I find in our city, we go from one extreme to another."
 On May 18, 2017, A motion to delay construction on Saturday morning by two hours failed at Thursday's community and protective services committee. Darouze was among four councillors opposing the motion, part of a larger noise by-law review.
 On March 20, 2018, CBC News published an analysis of the preceding three years of hospitality spending by councillors. The analysis found a four-way tie among councillors who expensed business lunches. Darouze was among the four who expensed 60 lunches during the council term. After Tim Tierney and Rick Chiarelli, Darouze was third in overall spending.
 Following a Byward market shooting in January 2019 by a man known to police, Darouze indicated he would not support a handgun ban, stating: "You can ban guns all you want. They just go to the States and buy them at corner store and smuggle them here.  We need to have tougher laws so if the criminal puts his hand on a gun and he gets caught, he goes to jail for a long, long time." However, 16 days after his comments were reported, Darouze voted unanimously with councillors to ban the sale and possession of handguns.
 In December 2019, Darouze was among three of four councillors voting in the rural and agricultural affairs committee to approve a warehouse in North Gower. The meeting had been attended by about 30 local residents opposed to the warehouse.
 On May 27, 2020, council voted on a motion from Mathieu Fleury to expand a program that provides people addicted to opioids with a safe supply of drugs. Fleury indicated the measure could increases in petty crime since the arrival of the pandemic. George Darouze was among three councillors voting against.
On September 22, 2021, council voted on a motion from Jeff Leiper to allow his Confederation Line (LRT) motion to be discussed, which would see city council hold bi-weekly meetings to address recent issues such as derailments. The motion was defeated. Darouze was among seven council members who dismissed the motion.

Dissenting votes 
From 2014 through March 30, 2021, there were 3,528 votes held. Of these, 35 votes were instances where Darouze dissented from the majority. Some of those instances follow.

 On August 31, 2016, a motion was voted on move the charging phase of the water pipes (shisha) prohibition from April 3, 2017, to September 30, 2017. Darouze was among four councillors in the minority in favour of the motion. A special permit for shisha events was also proposed in a separate motion and likewise defeated.
 On September 27, 2017, a motion was voted on to amend the Long Range Financial Plan V - Water, Wastewater and Stormwater Supported Programs (LRFPV) in various ways. Darouze was among three councillors in the minority opposed to the motion.
 On December 13, 2017, a motion was voted on to allocate 50% of the Hydro dividend for 2018 to Road Resurfacing and the other 50% towards energy efficient programs. Darouze was among 11 councillors in the minority opposed to the motion.
 On December 13, 2017, a motion was voted on to allow $23,000 to be reallocated from the Emergency Community Funding envelope for social agencies that do not receive Renewable Community Funding. Darouze was among three councillors in the minority opposed to the motion.
 On February 28, 2018, a motion was voted on regarding changes to OC Transpo regulations, including to "permit bicycles on the Confederation and Trillium lines without time restrictions." Darouze was among nine councillors in the minority opposed to the motion.
 On April 24, 2019, a motion was voted on to "declare a climate emergency for the purposes of naming, framing, and deepening our commitment to protecting our economy, our eco systems, and our community from climate change." Darouze was among three councillors in the minority opposed to the motion.
 On December 11, 2019, a motion was voted on to request staff report back on Ottawa's possible use of the concept known as Participatory budgeting, by which "community members are empowered for portions of a public budget". Darouze was among nine councillors in the minority opposed to the motion.
 On October 23, 2019, a motion was voted on regarding "the ability to use municipal parking revenues for projects related to sustainable transportation including sidewalk construction and cycling infrastructure." Darouze was among seven councillors in the minority opposed to the motion.
 On June 26, 2019, a motion was voted on asking "the Mayor write to the Province of Ontario to ask that the provincial funding for community legal clinics be maintained." Darouze was among six councillors in the minority opposed to the motion.

Electoral history 
After eight months of campaigning and knocking on over 9,000 doors, Darouze was elected as a first time councillor in the 2014 municipal election for Osgoode Ward. He won with 1,783 votes and 21.06% in a crowded race.

Darouze was re-elected in the 2018 municipal election as the councillor for Osgoode Ward. According to Horizon Ottawa, Darouze received $20,100 in campaign contributions from individuals connected to the real estate development industry, totaling 78% of contributions. Almost half of elected councillors also received the majority of their campaign contributions from such individuals.

References

External links

Ottawa city councillors
Lebanese emigrants to Canada
Living people
1964 births
Businesspeople from Ottawa